ASER may refer to:

 Adelaide Station and Environs Redevelopment of Adelaide railway station
 Appraisal subordination entitlement reduction